Archibald Miller may refer to:
Archibald Campbell Miller (1836–1898), farmer and political figure in Ontario, Canada
Archibald Eliot Haswell Miller (1887–1979), painter, illustrator and curator

See also  
Archie Miller (disambiguation)